The 1991–92 ECHL season was the fourth season of the ECHL.  In 1991, the league welcomed four new franchises: the Columbus Chill, Dayton Bombers, Raleigh Icecaps, and Toledo Storm.  The fifteen teams played 64 games in the schedule.  The Toledo Storm finished first overall in the regular season.  The Hampton Roads Admirals won their second straight Riley Cup championship.

League realignment
With the league expanded to fifteen teams, the league was realigned to include two separate divisions, East and West.

East Division
Greensboro Monarchs
Hampton Roads Admirals
Knoxville Cherokees
Raleigh Icecaps
Richmond Renegades
Roanoke Valley Rebels
Winston-Salem Thunderbirds

West Division
Cincinnati Cyclones
Columbus Chill
Dayton Bombers
Erie Panthers
Johnstown Chiefs
Louisville Icehawks
Nashville Knights
Toledo Storm

Regular season
Note: GP = Games played, W = Wins, L = Losses, T = Ties, Pts = Points, GF = Goals for, GA = Goals against, Green shade = Clinched playoff spot, Blue shade = Clinched division

Riley Cup playoffs

Bracket

East

1st round

2nd round

Divisional Finals

West

1st round

2nd round

Divisional Finals

Riley Cup Finals

ECHL awards

References
All stats come from Internet Hockey Database

See also
 ECHL
 ECHL All-Star Game
 Kelly Cup
 List of ECHL seasons

ECHL seasons
3